Guilherme Dias Alves (born 27 July 1992) is a taekwondo competitor from Brazil. He won a bronze medal in the 58 kg division at the 2013 World Championships. He also won a gold medal in the 2015 Military World Games in Mungyeong.

References

1992 births
Living people
Brazilian male taekwondo practitioners
World Taekwondo Championships medalists
21st-century Brazilian people